Noyelles-lès-Vermelles (literally Noyelles near Vermelles) is a commune in the Pas-de-Calais department in the Hauts-de-France region of France.

Geography

Population

Places of interest
 The church of St. Vaast, dating from the nineteenth century.
 Traces of the motte of the château de Beaulieu.
 The war memorial.

Twin towns
 Łomianki, Poland
 Waldenburg, Allemagne (Saxe)

See also
Communes of the Pas-de-Calais department

References

External links

 Official  website of the commune 

Noyelleslesvermelles